Aida Benítez Folch (born 24 November 1986) is a Spanish actress.

Biography 
Aida Benítez Folch was born in Reus in 1986. She started acting in 2002 when she was 14 years old and by 2017 had appeared in more than twenty films.

Selected filmography

References

External links
 
 
 

People from Reus
Spanish film actresses
Spanish television actresses
Actresses from Catalonia
1986 births
Living people
21st-century Spanish actresses